I Am the Night is the third studio album by American heavy metal band Pantera, released in 1985 through Metal Magic Records. It was made available only on vinyl and cassette, with any subsequent CD releases being bootlegs transferred from the vinyl or tape originals. It was the last Pantera album to feature lead singer Terry Glaze, as well as their second-to-last to feature a glam metal sound. The band made their second music video for the track "Hot and Heavy".

Track listing
All credits adapted from the original LP.

Personnel
Pantera
Terrence Lee – vocals
Diamond Darrell – guitar
Rex Rocker – bass
Vinnie Paul – drums

Production
Jerry Abbott – producer, engineer, mixing
Tom Coyne – mastering
Recorded and mixed at Pantego Sound, Pantego, Texas

References

Pantera albums
1985 albums